The naval campaigns, operations and battles of the Napoleonic Wars were events during the period of World-wide warfare between 1802 and 1814 that were undertaken by European powers in support of their land-based strategies. All events included in this article represent fleet actions that involved major naval commands larger than 3–4 ships of the line, and usually commanded by a flag officer.

The period commenced with the breakdown of the Peace of Amiens on the 16 May 1803. Three days later Cornwallis began the Blockade of Brest. On 10 May 1804 William Pitt was instrumental in creating the Third Coalition.

The Mediterranean

1803–1804
 Royal Navy blockade of the French ports (1803)
 Royal Navy blockade of the Spanish ports (1803)

1805 Allied operations
 Anglo-Russian invasion of Naples

1806–1807 Russian operations in the Adriatic
 Adriatic islands campaign of 1806

British 1807 operations
 Dardanelles Operation
 Battle of the Dardanelles (1807)
 Alexandria expedition of 1807

1808–1814
 Adriatic campaign of 1807–1814
 British Capri invasion
 British invasion of Naples (1809)
 British invasion of Sicily (1810)
 Ligurian campaign of 1814

The West Indies

1803–1804
 Expedition to Surinam

1805–1807
 West Indies islands campaign

The East Indies

1803–1811
 Linois's expedition to the Indian Ocean
 Java campaign of 1806–1807
 Mauritius campaign of 1809–1811
 Invasion of Java (1811)

The Atlantic

1803–1806
 Royal Navy blockade of the French ports (1803)
 Royal Navy blockade of the Spanish ports (1803)
 Action of 5 October 1804
 1805 The Trafalgar campaign
 1805 campaign of the sea lanes (1805–1810)
 Basque Roads operation
 French commerce raiding campaign of 1805
 Buenos Aires operation of 1806
 Escape of the Portuguese fleet

Peninsular War 1808–13
 British landing in Portugal (1808)
 Evacuation of the La Romana Division
 Capture of the Rosily Squadron
 1809 Corunna and Vigo evacuation
 British landing in Portugal (1809)
 Royal Navy Peninsular War supply operation

Anglo-American War of 1812–15
 List of naval battles of the War of 1812
 1813–1814 High Seas operations
 1813–1814 Great Lakes operations

The North Sea

1807 destruction of the Danish navy
 Gunboat War

1809
 Walcheren Campaign

The Baltic Sea
 Royal Navy supply of Prussian fortresses

Russo-Swedish War of 1808–09
 The Russo-Swedish 1809 Campaign

Anglo-Swedish War (1810–1812)
 Anglo-Swedish War (1810–1812)

Citations and notes

References
 von Pivka, Otto, Navies of the Napoleonic Era, David & Charles, London, 1980